17 Squadron SAAF is a squadron of the South African Air Force. It is currently a transport/utility helicopter squadron.

 First formed: 1 September 1939
 Historic aircraft flown: Junkers Ju 52/3m, Blenheim V, Lockheed Ventura GR V, Vickers Wellington, Vickers Warwick GR V, Harvard, Sikorsky S-55, Sikorsky S-51, Sud Aviation Alouette II, Aérospatiale Alouette III, Aérospatiale Puma, SA 365N Dauphin
 Current aircraft flown:  Atlas Oryx, Agusta A109LUH
 Current base: AFB Swartkop, Pretoria.

External links
17 Squadron SAAF Unofficial Website
Spanish tourist rescued during night helicopter operation on Drakensberg escarpment

Squadrons of the South African Air Force
Military units and formations in Pretoria
SAAF17
Military units and formations established in 1939
1939 establishments in South Africa